Catalonian Rhapsody is an album by pianist Tete Montoliu recorded in Spain in 1992 and first released on the Japanese label, Alfa before being reissued on Venus Records in 2014.

Track listing
All compositions are traditional except where noted.
 "The Lady from Aragon" – 7:01
 "Catalonian National Anthem" – 7:43
 "Three Young Ladies" – 6:34
 "The Singing of the Birds" – 6:55
 "Song of the Robber" – 6:25
 "Words of Love" (Joan Manuel Serrat) – 4:49
 "Don't Smoke Anymore" (Tete Montoliu) – 4:48
 "My Street" (Serrat) – 8:11

Personnel
Tete Montoliu – piano
Hein van de Geyn – bass
Idris Muhammad – drums

References

Tete Montoliu albums
1992 albums
Alfa Records albums
Venus Records albums